Yoni Appelbaum, an American historian and journalist, is Senior Editor for politics at The Atlantic.  Appelbaum was previously a columnist for the publication.

Early life and education
Appelbaum is the son of Diana Muir Karter and Dr. Paul S. Appelbaum. He was born in 1979 or 1980. He has two siblings: Binyamin Appelbaum and Avigail Appelbaum. His grandfather is nuclear engineer Peter Karter. His aunt is entrepreneur Trish Karter. He was raised in Newton, Massachusetts and is a graduate of the Maimonides School in Brookline, Massachusetts. Appelbaum holds an A.B., magna cum laude, from Columbia University (2003), and a Ph.D. in history from Brandeis University (2014).

Career
Before moving to The Atlantic, Appelbaum taught at Harvard University.  Appelbaum's academic work focused on what he has jokingly called the, "guilded age," the associative republicanism of the late 19th century, an era when mass-membership organizations like the Knights of Pythias, Chicago Lumber Exchange, and the Woman’s Christian Temperance Union were central to national politics.

In the March 2019 issue of The Atlantic, Appelbaum wrote a long-form article making the case for the impeachment of President Donald Trump. According to Margaret Sullivan writing in The Washington Post, Appelbaum's essay is the article that "moved... impeachment, all-but-taboo in Big Media’s coverage of Trump,...., from the margins into the mainstream — across the journalism spectrum."

Personal life
In 2004, Appelbaum married his college sweetheart, Emily Pressman of Wilmington, Delaware, in a Jewish ceremony at Columbia University. She is one year his junior. They have two children.

Publications
 How America Ends, 2019.

References

External links
 
 
 Yoni Appelbaum: The Historian in the Digital Age

American male journalists
Jewish American journalists
American magazine editors
The Atlantic (magazine) people
Brandeis University alumni
Columbia College (New York) alumni
Harvard University faculty
Living people
Maimonides School alumni
Year of birth missing (living people)
21st-century American journalists
21st-century American male writers